"Molly" is a song by American recording artist Lil Dicky from his debut studio album Professional Rapper. It was released along with the album on July 31, 2015, and it features guest vocals from American singer and lead vocalist of Panic! at the Disco, Brendon Urie. The song was produced by STREETRUNNER.

Background
The song title is the name of Dicky's ex-girlfriend, whom he considered his "soul mate". When asked about how the collaboration with Urie came about, Dicky responded by saying: "He tweeted at me one time, and I replied back telling him I was a fan, and then I had this song that I thought he could sound good on (Molly). He came in the studio that week, and man oh man…was he the perfect guy for the song."

The song is about how Dicky put his dreams above his relationship with Molly, his ex-girlfriend, and how he still reminisces on the good times they shared even if and when she gets married.

The song title has a double meaning, where it is the name of Dicky's ex-girlfriend, and a drug, which is a hard "pill to swallow" (a reference to the drug, "Molly"), a line that is sung in the chorus by Urie.

Music video
The music video premiered on June 9, 2016, on Lil Dicky's YouTube account. The music was directed by Jamie Lees, and features Dicky as a dejected wedding guest as he watches his lost love get married, whilst Brendon Urie plays the role of the wedding singer. Logan Paul makes an appearance in the music video. As of September 2022, the music video has surpassed 74 million views.

References 

Lil Dicky songs
2015 songs